The 1929 Italian Rugby Union Championship ("Campionato Italiano di Rugby") was the first edition of the tournament.

Six clubs contested the tiles, won by Ambrosiana that became famous after as Amatori Rugby Milano . At those time it was the rugby section of Ambrosiana-Inter F.C.

The opening match should be between Michelin - Ambrosiana on February 12, 1929, at the Velodrome Humbert I, in Turin, but was delayed for bad weather conditions,.

The finals matches were played between Ambrosiana and Lazio: in the first match at Stadio Nazionale PNF, Lazio won 5-0, but in the return match won the "Ambrosiana" 10-3.

In the tie-break match on neutral ground of Bologna, Ambrosiana won 3-0.

Team participating

Girone A 
 Ambrosiana
 Leonessa Brescia
 Michelin Torino

Girone B 
 Bologna
 Lazio (Rome)
 Leoni San Marco (Padua)

Formula 
The six teams were divided in two pool of three. The winner of each pool qualified to finals

Results

Ranking

Pool A

Pool B

Finals

Barrage

Verditcs 
  Ambrosiana champion of Italy (1st title)

Notes

Bibliography 
 

1929
Italy
Rugby Union Championship
Rugby Union Championship